Acronneus is a genus of tephritid  or fruit flies in the family Tephritidae.

Species
Acronneus bryanti Munro, 1929

References

Tephritinae
Tephritidae genera
Diptera of Africa